Harry Jack Ellis (born 10 September 1995) is an English professional golfer. 

In 2012, Ellis became the youngest winner of the English Amateur at the age of 16, beating the previous record held by Nick Faldo. As a junior, at Florida State University, Ellis was named a PING honorable mention All-American.

In 2017, Ellis won The Amateur Championship, becoming just the third player to win both the English Amateur and The Amateur Championship, joining Michael Bonallack and Michael Lunt. The win gained him entry to the 2017 Open Championship, the 2018 Masters Tournament, the 2018 Memorial Tournament, and the 2018 U.S. Open.

Following the 2018 U.S. Open, Ellis turned professional on the Challenge Tour.

Amateur wins
2012 English Amateur
2016 Lagonda Trophy
2017 The Amateur Championship, Marquette Intercollegiate Championship
2018 Mobile Sports Authority Intercollegiate, Georgia Cup

Source:

Professional wins (1)
2020 Memorial Olivier Barras

Results in major championships

CUT = missed the half-way cut

Team appearances
Jacques Léglise Trophy (representing Great Britain and Ireland): 2012
European Amateur Team Championship (representing England): 2017
Arnold Palmer Cup (representing Europe): 2017
Walker Cup (representing Great Britain & Ireland): 2017

Source:

References

English male golfers
Florida State Seminoles men's golfers
1995 births
Living people